Lorenzo Cilembrini (born 9 November 1981), better known as Il Cile, is an Italian singer-songwriter. His debut single, "Cemento armato", was released in 2012 and later included in the album Siamo morti a vent'anni, issued by Universal Music during the same year. In 2013, he competed in the Newcomers' section of the 63rd Sanremo Music Festival, performing the song "Le parole non servono più", but was eliminated during the second night of the show. 
In 2014, he released his second studio album, In Cile Veritas, which became his second top ten record in Italy. He also appeared as a featured artist on the single "Maria Salvador", by Italian rapper J-Ax, which achieved commercial success in 2015.

Discography

Studio albums

Writing credits

References

1981 births
Italian pop singers
Living people
People from Arezzo
21st-century Italian male  singers